Arthur Welsby (17 November 1902 – 24 April 1980) was an English footballer who played as an outside forward.

He played for Wigan Borough from 1923 to 1931, and holds the record for most league appearances for the club. Due to the club's financial crisis, he left the club in 1931 and moved to Sunderland, where he made three appearances, scoring one goal. He went on to play for Exeter City, Stockport County, Southport, Cardiff City and Mossley.

References

1902 births
1980 deaths
Footballers from Wigan
Association football forwards
English footballers
Wigan Borough F.C. players
English Football League players
Sunderland A.F.C. players
Exeter City F.C. players
Stockport County F.C. players
Southport F.C. players
Cardiff City F.C. players
Mossley A.F.C. players
People from Ashton-in-Makerfield